Darehderaz (also Romanized as Darrehderāz) is a village in Deh Bakri Rural District, in the Central District of Bam County, Kerman Province, Iran. At the 2016 census, its population was 54, in 14 families.

References 

Populated places in Bam County